George Daniels (7 December 1898 – 1995) was an English footballer who played for Preston North End and Rochdale.

References

Rochdale A.F.C. players
Preston North End F.C. players
Bury F.C. players
Altrincham F.C. players
Ellesmere Port Town F.C. players
Association football wingers
English footballers
1898 births
1995 deaths